The Hani language (Hani:  or ;) is a language of the Loloish (Yi) branch of the Tibeto-Burman linguistic group spoken in China, Laos, Myanmar, and Vietnam by the Hani people.

Distribution
In China, Hani is spoken mostly in areas to the east of the Mekong River in south-central Yunnan province, mostly in Pu'er and Honghe prefectures, as well as in parts of other surrounding prefectures. Hani is also spoken in Lai Châu and Lào Cai provinces of northwestern Vietnam and in Phongsaly Province of Laos along the border with Yunnan.

Edmondson (2002) reports that the Hani of Vietnam are distributed in two provinces of northwestern Vietnam where two distinct dialects are found, one east of Muong Te and the other to the west. The Hani of Vietnam claim to be able to communicate in the Hani language with ethnic Hani from different areas of Vietnam despite significant geographical barriers. Edmondson (2002) reports that the different Hani speech varieties in Vietnam differ mostly in lexicon.

Phonology
Hani has three main tones and two types of short vowels.

Consonants

Vowels 
Vowel length in Hani is also distinctive.

Orthography

Oral tradition tells of an ancient written script for Hani but says it was lost when the Hani migrated from Sichuan. In China, Standard Hani, which is based on the Lüchun County dialect, is written using a Romanized script developed by the Chinese government during the 1950s. As with the Latin-based scripts of the Zhuang, Hmong and Iu Mien languages, it uses final consonant letters to represent tone.

Consonants in Hani orthography are pronounced the same as in pinyin, with two additional digraphs for voiced fricatives in Hani. The IPA equivalents for letters in Hani orthography are provided below.

The vowels in Hani orthography are as follows. After vowels, -v is used to mark tense vowels.

There are four tones, which are marked by letters at the ends of words, or not at all for the mid-level [33]. Numerical Chao tones are provided below.

Sample text

See also
 Hani languages

Notes

References

External links
 Hani language recordings at GlobalRecordings.net
 Hani–Japanese wordlist with comparison with related languages 

Southern Loloish languages
Languages of China
Languages of Laos
Languages of Vietnam